Hello! is the sixth studio album by the British rock band Status Quo. Released in September 1973, it was the first of four Status Quo albums to top the UK Albums Chart. It was the first Status Quo album on which drummer John Coghlan was credited with songwriting.

Keyboard player Andy Bown and saxophonists Stewart Blandamer and Steve Farr played on "Blue Eyed Lady".  This was Bown's first appearance on a Status Quo album; he guested on several subsequent releases, and became a permanent member of the line-up a few years later. Blandamer and Farr also played on "Forty Five Hundred Times", which featured piano by John Mealing.

Background
1973 started for Status Quo with the belated chart success, in January, of the 1972 releases on their new label Vertigo, leading to their first top ten entry on the album charts and a long-awaited return to the top ten of the singles chart. As a result, Status Quo's previous record company Pye decided to release a single from their 1971 album Dog of Two Head. The single, Francis Rossi and Bob Young's "Mean Girl", reached No. 20 upon its release. It was backed by the Rossi/Parfitt composition "Everything", taken from the band's 1970 album Ma Kelly's Greasy Spoon.

In August 1973 the only single from the new album, Rossi and Young's "Caroline", was released, reaching No. 5. It was the group's first single to reach the UK top five. Its B-side was a non-album track titled "Joanne", written by Alan Lancaster and Rick Parfitt.

Hello! was released in September that year, and became the most successful album the band had ever released. Initial copies of the record on vinyl came with a large black and white poster of the group. Of the eight tracks on the album, only six of them were new. "Caroline" had already been heard by the public as a single release, while "Softer Ride" had served as the B-side to the band's "Paper Plane" single from their previous album Piledriver.

No other singles were issued from the album, although a live version of "Roll Over Lay Down" appeared on a three-track EP released in May 1975, which reached No. 9 in the UK Singles Chart and No. 2 on the Australian Singles Chart.

This was the band's first album to feature the band's name written in the now-familiar font used on most subsequent album covers.

Reception

In a retrospective review, AllMusic criticized the over-simplicity of many of the songs and overindulgence of some, while praising the energy. They concluded that the album manages to be effective and enjoyable in spite of its flaws, concluding, "Clearly the product of a band at their commercial and creative peak, Hello! wears its strengths and weaknesses well: not particularly flashy or intelligent, but without exception confident, comfortable and fun."

Track listing

2005 reissue bonus track
 "Joanne" (Parfitt, Lancaster) – 4:06 (originally the B-side of "Caroline").

2015 deluxe edition CD 2
 "Joanne" (Parfitt, Lancaster) – 4:06
 "Caroline" (Rossi, Young) – original demo fast – 2:09
 "Caroline" (Rossi, Young) – original demo slow – 3:08
 "Don't Waste My Time" (Rossi, Young) – live 1973 Reading Festival – 4:20
 "Caroline" (Rossi, Young) – mono edit – 2:42
 "Caroline" (Rossi, Young) – stereo edit – 2:42
 "Is it Really Me/Gotta Go Home" (Lancaster) – live 10 April 1973, Dublin National Stadium – 25:17

Personnel
Status Quo
 Francis Rossi – lead and various guitars, vocals
 Rick Parfitt – second and various guitar, piano, vocals
 Alan Lancaster – bass guitar, vocals
 John Coghlan – drums, various percussion
Additional personnel
 Andy Bown – piano on "Blue Eyed Lady"
 John Mealing – piano on "Forty-Five Hundred Times"
 Steve Farr – alto saxophone
 Stewart Blandamer – tenor saxophone

Charts

Certifications

References

Status Quo (band) albums
1973 albums
A&M Records albums
Vertigo Records albums
Albums recorded at IBC Studios